Friedrich Soennecken (20 September 1848 – 2 July 1919) was an entrepreneur and inventor. He was the founder of Soennecken, a German office supplier.

Soennecken was born in Iserlohn-Dröschede, Sauerland in 1848, the son of a blacksmith. On 27 May 1875 he founded the F. Soennecken Verlag, a commercial enterprise in Remscheid, Westphalia.

He is best known for the reintroduction of a Rundschrift (round script) style of calligraphy and the broad pen nib associated with it. While ronde script rendered with quill originated in late 16th-century France and was widely used in the country throughout 17th and 18th centuries, it fell out of popularity after the invention of a mass-produced pointed pen from steel in early 19th century.

Round writing was designed to be a visually appealing, standardized style of penmanship which was easy to learn and execute, and Soennecken published books on the topic in several languages. As a result, broad-nibbed pen (this time from steel) was popular again not just in Germany, but also in France, Russia and elsewhere; scribes of the French Ministry of Finance used it even until right after World War II.

In 1888, Friedrich Nietzsche wrote to a friend that he had finally discovered both a quality paper to write on and a quality pen from Germany: Soenneckens Rundschrift Federhalter.

Soennecken also introduced the two-hole punch and the ring binder. In 1876 he and his company relocated to Poppelsdorf, near Bonn, to be closer to the University which later awarded him the honorary title Dr. med. h. c..

Soennecken died in Bonn in 1919.

Inventions   

 Ink container with stable stand (invented as an apprentice)
 A style of writing with the round tip of the feather of a pen nib (1860)
 An early type of binder which later became the Soennecken file (1886) 
 The hole punch
 The ring binder, later symbolically part of the logo of Soennecken

Literature   
 Hans Schreiber: Soennecken Alphabete No. 7 (Neue Rundschrift), Verlag Soennecken, Zurich, approx. 1930

References

External links 
 
 life and history of Soennecken (German)

1848 births
1919 deaths
19th-century German inventors
19th-century German businesspeople
20th-century German businesspeople
German company founders
People from Iserlohn